Dom Afonso I of Braganza (10 August 1377 – 15 December 1461) was the first duke of Braganza and the eighth count of Barcelos. He founded the House of Braganza, the most powerful and wealthy dynasty in Portugal. His descendants became high-ranking nobles, imperial officials, and finally kings of Portugal and emperors of Brazil.

Early life 
Historians believe he was born in Veiros, Estremoz, Alentejo, as a natural son of Portuguese King John I and Inês Peres. He married the heiress Beatriz Pereira de Alvim, daughter of Nuno Álvares Pereira, a general and the wealthiest man in the kingdom.

A traveled and cultivated man, Afonso was present in 1415 when the Portuguese conquered Ceuta.

Royal succession 

When his half-brother, King Duarte I of Portugal, died in 1438, his son Afonso V (Afonso's nephew) was an infant and the choice of regent was his sister-in-law, the Queen Mother Eleonor of Aragon. This choice was not popular because Eleonor was Aragonese. Among the aristocracy, however — especially Afonso's inner circle —, Eleonor of Aragon was preferred. There were also doubts about Peter's political ability. At a meeting of the Portuguese Cortes summoned by Afonso's half-brother John, Lord of Reguengos de Monsaraz, the regency was awarded to the Infante Peter, Duke of Coimbra, another half-brother of Afonso and an uncle of the young king. This choice pleased both the people and the fast-growing bourgeoisie.

In 1443, in a gesture of reconciliation, Peter made Afonso the first Duke of Braganza. But, in 1445, Afonso took offence because Isabella of Coimbra, Peter's daughter, became the choice for Afonso V's wife, and not one of his granddaughters. Indifferent to the intrigues, Peter continued his regency and the country prospered under his rule. It was during this period that the first subsidies for the exploration of the Atlantic Ocean were appropriated under the supervision of Henry the Navigator (another of Afonso's half-brothers).

On 9 June 1448, King Afonso V came of age, and Peter turned over control of the country to the king. An ambitious man, Afonso persuaded his nephew, the young king, to turn against Peter. Influenced by Afonso, the king nullified all of Peter's edicts.

The following year, under accusations that years later would prove false, Afonso V declared his uncle Peter a rebel. The situation became unsustainable and a civil war began. On 20 May 1449, during the Battle of Alfarrobeira, near Alverca, Peter was killed.

After the Battle of Alfarrobeira, Afonso V gave new powers to his uncle Afonso and nine years later when he departed for Africa, the regency was delegated to him.

Marriages and issue 
Afonso married twice. His first marriage was to Beatriz Pereira de Alvim, on 8 November 1400, with whom he had three children:

Afonso married a second time, to his first cousin once removed, Constance of Noronha, daughter of Alfonso Enríquez, Count of Gijón and Noreña (a natural son of Henry II of Castile), and of Isabel of Portugal (a natural daughter of Fernando I of Portugal). They had no issue.

Ancestry

See also 
Duke of Braganza
List of Dukes of Braganza

Notes

References 
 Nobreza de Portugal e Brasil, Vol. II pages 437 to 439. Published by Zairol Lda., Lisbon 1989.
 Genealogical information on Afonso, Duke of Braganza (in Portuguese)

External links 

|-

House of Braganza
Illegitimate children of Portuguese monarchs
Dukes of Braganza
1377 births
1461 deaths
People from Estremoz
14th-century Portuguese people
15th-century Portuguese people
Sons of kings